The piezooptic effect is manifest as a change in refractive index, n, of a material caused by a change in pressure on that material.  Early demonstrations of the piezooptic effect were done on liquids.  The effect has since been demonstrated in solid, crystalline materials.

References

Optics